The  LNWR Samson Class was a class of ninety  steam locomotives built by the London and North Western Railway at their Crewe Works between 1863 and 1879.

Ostensibly a mixed traffic design, they were the first locomotives with coupled driving wheels to be allocated for passenger duties on the LNWR.

They were designed by John Ramsbottom who had fifty built, all without cabs and with pierced driving wheel splashers. Ramsbottom's successor F. W. Webb, built forty more, all with cabs. The earlier locomotives also gained cabs, and all eventually had their splashers filled in.

All ninety locomotives were 'renewed' (replaced) by a like number of Waterloo Class locomotives between 1889 and 1905, but only eighty were scrapped quickly. The ten exceptions were transferred to the Civil Engineer's list, and these were withdrawn between 1914 and 1925. No examples have been preserved.

References 

Samson
2-4-0 locomotives
Railway locomotives introduced in 1863